A Philadelphia roll is a makizushi (also classified as a kawarizushi) type of sushi generally made with smoked salmon, cream cheese, and cucumber, with the rice on the outside (uramaki). It is commonly made with imitation crab instead of salmon, but can be found to include other ingredients, such as other types of fish, avocado, scallions, and sesame seed. Like many Western-inspired sushi rolls, its design and name are modified to target an American market, which includes putting the rice on the outside, and the nori in the inside (inside-out sushi) to appeal to western aesthetics.

References

External links 

Sushi in the United States
Cuisine of Philadelphia
American fusion cuisine